A primary metabolite is a kind of metabolite that is directly involved in normal growth, development, and reproduction. It usually performs a physiological function in the organism (i.e. an intrinsic function). A primary metabolite is typically present in many organisms or cells. It is also referred to as a central metabolite, which has an even more restricted meaning (present in any autonomously growing cell or organism). Some common examples of primary metabolites include: lactic acid, and certain amino acids. Note that primary metabolites do not show any pharmacological actions or effects.

Conversely, a secondary metabolite is not directly involved in those processes, but usually has an important ecological function (i.e. a relational function). A secondary metabolite is typically present in a taxonomically restricted set of organisms or cells (plants, fungi, bacteria, etc.). Some common examples of secondary metabolites include: ergot alkaloids, antibiotics, naphthalenes, nucleosides, phenazines, quinolines, terpenoids, peptides and growth factors.

Plant growth regulators may be classified as both primary and secondary metabolites due to their role in plant growth and development. Some of them are intermediates between primary and secondary metabolism.

See also 

Metabolism
Metabolite
Secondary metabolite
Antimetabolite
Metabolic control analysis, a specific kind of control analysis
Metabolome
Metabolomics — the study of global metabolites profile in a system (cell, tissue, or organism) under a given set of conditions
Volatile Organic Compounds

References 

Metabolism